La Aguada Airport,  is an airstrip  north of Pencahue, a town in the Maule Region of Chile.

See also

Transport in Chile
List of airports in Chile

References

External links
OpenStreetMap – La Aguada
OurAirports – La Aguada
SkyVector – La Aguada
FallingRain – La Aguada Airport

Airports in Maule Region